Buix is a former municipality in the district of Porrentruy in the canton of Jura in Switzerland.  

On 1 January 2009 the former municipalities of Buix, Courtemaîche and Montignez merged to form the new municipality of Basse-Allaine.

The village is situated in a small valley in the middle of which runs the river Allaine.

References

External links

Former municipalities of the canton of Jura
Populated places disestablished in 2009